Anna Karamazoff is a 1991 Soviet drama film directed by Rustam Khamdamov. It was entered into the 1991 Cannes Film Festival.

Cast
 Jeanne Moreau as Woman (voice by Svetlana Nemolyayeva and Olga Volkova)
 Yelena Solovey as Silent Film Star  
 Natalya Leble as Natasha
 Viktor Sibilyov as Young Man
 Gregory Hlady (as Grigori Gladij)
 Yuri Solomin as rich man
 Natalya Fateyeva as his wife
 Vladislav Vetrov as Roshchin-Insarov, graphologist
 Emmanuil Vitorgan as Prokudin-Gorsky, director
 Aleksandr Feklistov as Aleksandr Vasilyevich
 Maria Vinogradova as black woman, concierge, assistant director in  theater
 Svetlana Nemolyayeva as neighbour
 Gennadi Nilov as KGB major
Maria Kapnist as granny Sonia

References

External links

1991 films
1991 drama films
Soviet drama films
1990s Russian-language films
Mosfilm films
Films produced by Serge Silberman
French drama films
French multilingual films
Soviet multilingual films
1991 multilingual films
1990s French films